Final tables of the Lithuanian Championship in 2003 are presented below. The Lithuanian Football Federation (LFF) organized three football leagues: A Lyga (the highest), 1 Lyga (second-tier), and 2 Lyga (third-tier), which comprised four regional zones.

A Lyga

LFF 1 Lyga

LFF 2 Lyga

Final tournament
For the first time a one-round tournament was organized between the winners of each zone.

LFF 2 Lyga zone East

LFF 2 Lyga zone South

LFF 2 Lyga zone West

LFF 2 Lyga zone North

References

LFF Lyga seasons
1
Lith
Lith